Rubén Darío Rossi, (born October 28, 1973) is an Argentine footballer who played as a forward.

Club career
He played for Busan IPark of the South Korean K League, then known as Daewoo Royals.

References

External links
 

1973 births
Living people
Argentine footballers
Association football forwards
San Lorenzo de Almagro footballers
Busan IPark players
Argentine expatriate footballers
Argentine Primera División players
K League 1 players
Expatriate footballers in South Korea
Argentine expatriate sportspeople in South Korea
Footballers from Santa Fe, Argentina